The 2023 Reyes de Jalisco season is the Reyes de Jalisco second season in the Liga de Fútbol Americano Profesional (LFA) and their second under head coach Ernesto Alfaro.

The Reyes started the season with a victory over Gallos Negros 42–14. On their next match, they defeated Raptors for the first team in the team's history.

Draft

Roster

Regular season

Standings

Schedule

References

2023 in American football
Reyes